"More" is a song recorded by South Korean rapper J-Hope of BTS for his debut album Jack in the Box. It was released for digital download and streaming on July 1, 2022, as the album's lead single by Big Hit Music.

Charts

Release history

References

External links 
 

2022 singles
2022 songs
Hybe Corporation singles
Korean-language songs
Songs written by J-Hope